KZHR (92.5 FM) is a radio station broadcasting a Regional Mexican format. Licensed to Dayton, Washington, United States, the station serves the Tri-Cities and Walla Walla areas.  The station is owned by Townsquare Media.

References

External links

ZHR
Radio stations established in 1982
1982 establishments in Washington (state)
Regional Mexican radio stations in the United States
Townsquare Media radio stations